Saraskand-e Sofla (also Romanized as Sarāskand-e Soflá; also known as Āzarān-e Pā’īn, Sarāskand-e Pā’īn, and Sareskand-e Pā’īn) is a village in Almalu Rural District, Nazarkahrizi District, Hashtrud County, East Azerbaijan Province, Iran. At the 2006 census, its population was 210, in 35 families.

References 

Towns and villages in Hashtrud County